The culture of capitalism or capitalist culture is the set of social practices, social norms, values and patterns of behavior that are attributed to the capitalist economic system in a capitalist society. Capitalist culture promotes the accumulation of capital and the sale of commodities, where individuals are primarily defined by their relationship to business and the market. The culture is composed of people who, behaving according to a set of learned rules, act as they must act in order to survive in capitalist societies.

Elements of capitalist culture include the mindset of business and corporate culture, consumerism and working class culture.

Capitalist culture and ideology
While certain political ideologies, such as neoliberalism, assume and promote the view that the behavior that capitalism fosters in individuals is natural to humans, anthropologists like Richard Robbins point out that there is nothing natural about this behavior - people are not naturally dispossessed to accumulate wealth and driven by wage-labor.

Political ideologies such as neoliberalism abstract the economic sphere from other aspects of society (politics, culture, family etc., with any political activity constituting an intervention into the natural process of the market, for example) and assume that people make rational exchanges in the sphere of market transactions. However, applying the concept of embeddedness to market societies, the sociologist Granovetter demonstrates that rational economic exchanges are actually heavily influenced by pre-existing social ties and other factors.

In a capitalist system, society and culture revolve around business activity (the accumulation of capital). As such, business activity and the market exchange are often viewed as being absolute or "natural" in that all other human social relations revolve around these processes (or should exist to facilitate one's ability to perform these processes).

See also
 Capital accumulation
 Capitalism
 Capitalist mode of production
 Capitalist state
 Consumerism
 Cultural capital
 Cultural economics
 Economic sociology
 Neoliberalism
 Organizational culture
 Protestant work ethic

References

Anthropology
Capitalism
Cultural economics
Economic anthropology
Political culture
Sociology of culture